is a 2007 Japanese drama film written and directed by Shinji Aoyama, adapted from his novel. Being third and last of Aoyama's "Kitakyushu Saga", Sad Vacation brings together several characters from his previous films Helpless and Eureka and continues to explore their lives, all the while being a separate story that doesn't require watching previous films. It was named after the Johnny Thunders song.

Plot
Kenji Shiraishi (Tadanobu Asano) is involved in trafficking of illegal immigrants from China to Japan. One of such cases leaves an immigrant child to be an orphan. Instead of selling him with others that arrived, Kenji flees with the boy to look after him and make an attempt at normal life. The people after the boy, unexpected encounter with long lost family members and his own vengeful nature are standing in a way of his future.

Cast
 Tadanobu Asano as Kenji Shiraishi
 Eri Ishida as Chiyoko Mamiya
 Aoi Miyazaki as Kozue Tamura
 Yuka Itaya as Saeko Shiina
 Katsuo Nakamura as Shigeki Mamiya
 Kengo Kora as Yusuke Mamiya
 Kaori Tsuji as Yuri Matsumura
 Joe Odagiri as Goto
 Ken Mitsuishi as Shigeo
 Yoichiro Saito as Akihiko
 Maho Toyota as Makimura
 Kōsuke Toyohara as Kawashima
 Kyūsaku Shimada as Sone
 Yusuke Kawazu as Kijima

Reception
Travis Mackenzie Hoover of Exclaim! gave the film a favorable review, saying: "While the film is a tad on the nose with some of its dialogue (and has a magic-realist coda totally out of character with the rest of the movie), mostly the approach is singular, uncompromising and strangely affirmative in spite of it all." Todd Brown of Twitch Film described the film as "a quietly powerful drama in which Aoyama manages to address blood ties, fate and regeneration".

Awards
It won the Jury Award at the 2008 New York Asian Film Festival.

References

External links
 
 

2007 films
2000s Japanese-language films
Films directed by Shinji Aoyama
2000s Japanese films